The men's moguls event in freestyle skiing at the 2002 Winter Olympics in Salt Lake City, United States took place on 12 February at Park City.

Results

Qualification
The qualification was held at 09:00, with 30 skiers competing. The top 16 advanced to the final.

Final
The final was held at 12:00, with Janne Lahtela, the second-best qualifier, just beating top qualifier Travis Mayer for the gold medal. The final wasn't without controversy however as Moseley's "dinner roll" was scored as a 360 with a break of form. Following the event FIS updated its scoring system making changes which if done earlier would have resulted in Moseley winning the gold medal.

References

Men's freestyle skiing at the 2002 Winter Olympics
Men's events at the 2002 Winter Olympics